José Alberto Hernández Pérez  (born February 9, 1969) is a Cuban baseball player and Olympic gold medalist. He was born in Holguín, Cuba. 
Hernández is a two time Gold medalist for baseball, winning at the 1992 Summer Olympics and the 1996 Summer Olympics.

References 
 

1969 births
Living people
Olympic baseball players of Cuba
Olympic gold medalists for Cuba
Olympic medalists in baseball
Medalists at the 1992 Summer Olympics
Medalists at the 1996 Summer Olympics
Baseball players at the 1992 Summer Olympics
Baseball players at the 1996 Summer Olympics
Pan American Games gold medalists for Cuba
Baseball players at the 1991 Pan American Games
Pan American Games medalists in baseball
Central American and Caribbean Games gold medalists for Cuba
Competitors at the 1993 Central American and Caribbean Games
Goodwill Games medalists in baseball
Central American and Caribbean Games medalists in baseball
Competitors at the 1990 Goodwill Games
Medalists at the 1991 Pan American Games
20th-century Cuban people